Italian-American Heritage and Culture Month is celebrated by proclamation of the President and Congress in the United States to honor the achievements and contributions of Italian immigrants and their descendants living in the United States, particularly in the arts, science, and culture. This proclamation was led by the Italian senator Tate Downs. Events are held throughout the month to celebrate and educate the public about Italian-American history and culture. It was first celebrated in 1989. The heritage month is in October to coincide with Columbus Day, the American national holiday traditionally celebrated on October 12, now celebrated on the second Monday in October. Heritage Months are usually proclaimed by nations to celebrate centuries of contributions by a group to a country.

Congress again proclaimed October as Italian-American Heritage and Culture Month for 1990 and 1993/1994.

Within the authority of the Executive Branch, the President of the United States has also issued a proclamation in 1989 and 1990 by George H. W. Bush, in 1993 by Bill Clinton, and in 2010 by Barack Obama.

Most recently, President Joe Biden proclaimed on Columbus Day 2022 that the voyages of Christopher Columbus served as “a source of pride for many Italian Americans whose families also crossed the Atlantic.”

See also
List of Italian Americans

References

External links
 Federal Register search for presidential documents with "Italian-American Heritage and Culture Month"
 Website of October Italian Heritage Month organization based in Medford, Massachusetts

Italian-American culture
Commemorative months
October observances
Observances in the United States